Shenzhen MSU-BIT University (SMBU;), was established in 2016 as a non-profit higher education institution with an independent status of legal entity. Located in Longgang District, Shenzhen, Guangdong, it was cofounded by Lomonosov Moscow State University, Beijing Institute of Technology, and Shenzhen Municipal People's Government. The permanent campus has received 2.04 billion yuan (US$318 million) in investment from the Shenzhen Municipal Government. Specially for the possibility of opening the university, changes were made to the Russian Federal Law "About Moscow State University Lomonosov and St. Petersburg State University".

On 13 September 2017, Vice-Premiers of the two countries – Olga Golodets and Liu Yandong, as well as delegations from each founders took part in the Opening Ceremony. Ceremony participants received high-level greetings.

The university is the first Sino-Russian cooperative university, the ninth Sino-foreign university in China and second Sino-foreign university in Shenzhen. SMBU is a member of Sino-Foreign Cooperative University Union.

Campus
The university campus is located in the southwest part of the Longgang district, Shenzhen city and covers a total of about 34-hectares. Its main building is very similar to that of Lomonosov Moscow State University.

More than half of the teaching faculty is from Lomonosov Moscow State University with Doctor of Sciences degrees of the Russian Federation and above. Education is in Russian, English and Chinese languages.

Departments
Five departments offering bachelor's, master's and doctoral programs:
Faculty of Philology
 bachelor's, master's and doctoral programs (In Russian)
Faculty of Biology
 bachelor's and doctoral programs (In Russian)
 master's program (In English)
Faculty of Materials Science
 bachelor's program (In Russian)
Faculty of Computational Mathematics and Cybernetics
 bachelor's program (In Russian)
Faculty of Economics
 bachelor's program (In Russian)

References 

Universities and colleges in Shenzhen
Educational institutions established in 2016
2016 establishments in China
China–Russia relations
Moscow State University
Beijing Institute of Technology
Longgang District, Shenzhen